Alain Issa Omari Sargeant (born 27 November 1995) is a footballer who plays as a defender for Simcoe County Rovers FC in League1 Ontario. Born in Canada, he represents the Saint Kitts and Nevis national team.

Early life 
Sargeant began his career with North Toronto Nitros, playing for the club from 2007 until 2010. He was selected for the Toronto Soccer Association District team in 2007, as well as the Region 3 Regional Team in 2007 and 2008. He then represented Ajax Gunners 95 in 2010 and 2011. Sargeant attended Bill Crothers Secondary School, where he played for the high school team for two years. During that time he featured for the Toronto FC Academy, having joined in 2011.

Sargeant was nominated for Canadian Soccer League Defender of the Year that same season, as well as finishing as an Under-17 Adidas Generation Cup finalist. After a successful season, Sargeant clinched the Canadian Soccer League Second Division title with the Toronto FC Academy.

College career 
Sargeant attended George Mason University, and played in all 20 matches over the 2014 season for the George Mason Patriots. The following year, he made a further 17 appearances for the Patriots.

Club career
During 2014, Sargeant also played for K-W United, finishing second in the USL Premier Development League. 

In 2015, he returned to the PDL, this time with Toronto FC Academy making 11 appearances.

In 2016, he moved to AC Connecticut.

In 2018, Sargeant played with Vaughan Azzurri in League1 Ontario. In the winter of 2018-19, he played indoor soccer in the Mississauga-based Arena Premier League with the Caribbean Stars AC.

In 2019, he played with the Thunder Bay Chill in USL League Two.

In 2021, he returned to Vaughan Azzurri.

In 2022, he joined Simcoe County Rovers, but did not appear in any matches.

International career 
Sargeant made his international debut for St. Kitts & Nevis on February 21, 2016, featuring in a 3-0 victory over Bermuda. He was later called up to be included in the international squad for 2017 Caribbean Cup qualification.

Personal 
Sargeant is the son of Osmond Sargeant and Yvonne Osondu, and grew up in Scarborough, Toronto, Ontario. His father was a triple jumper, and was born in St. Kitts, therefore allowing Sargeant to represent the St. Kitts and Nevis national team.

References 

1995 births
Living people
Citizens of Saint Kitts and Nevis through descent
Saint Kitts and Nevis footballers
Association football defenders
Saint Kitts and Nevis international footballers
Soccer players from Toronto
Canadian soccer players
Canadian people of Saint Kitts and Nevis descent
Sportspeople of Saint Kitts and Nevis descent
Canadian Soccer League (1998–present) players
League1 Ontario players
USL League Two players
North Toronto Nitros players
Toronto FC players
Vaughan Azzurri players
K-W United FC players
Thunder Bay Chill players
Simcoe County Rovers FC players